Boonville was the first county seat of Brazos County, Texas, now a ghost town.

History
Boonville was the county seat in Brazos County (formerly known as Navasota County) from the 1840s to the 1860s. Boonville was named in honor of Mordecai Boon, Sr., nephew of Daniel Boone. When the Houston and Texas Central Railway was extended from Millican to Bryan in 1866, Bryan was made the county seat.

The former town site is now located in Bryan near State Highway 6. Since the 1990s, a cemetery on Boonville Road has been the last remaining structure associated with Boonville. It is marked by a Texas Centennial monument.

The area around the cemetery is now the Boonville Heritage Park as of early 2015. The park has new structures including a log cabin built in 1856 and relocated from Grimes County, Texas. The park also features a Six flags over Texas Plaza, a replica of a "Twin Sister" cannon and interpretive panels.

References

External links

Geography of Brazos County, Texas
Ghost towns in East Texas